God's Hand in Mine is a studio album by Slim Whitman, released in 1966 on Imperial Records.

Release history 
The album was issued in the United States by Imperial Records as a 12-inch long-playing record, catalog numbers LP 9308 (mono) and LP 12308 (stereo).

Track listing

References 

1966 albums
Slim Whitman albums
Imperial Records albums
Christian music albums